Saliès is a commune in the Tarn department in southern France.

Notable people
 Antoinette de Saliès (1639–1730), writer, feminist

See also
Communes of the Tarn department

References

Communes of Tarn (department)